Members of the Legislative Assembly of Samoa were elected on 4 March 2011. The Legislative Assembly consisted of 49 representatives, elected from six two-seat and 35 single-seat territorial constituencies, and two non-territorial constituencies.  Only two of the MPs were women following the general election, a decline from four in the previous Parliament. A third woman, Faimalotoa Kika Stowers, joined them after winning a by-election in August 2014.

Members

Initial MPs

Summary of changes
 Following the general election, the elections in four constituencies were voided by the Supreme Court due to acts of corruption (such as bribery and treating). Simultaneous by-elections were held in all four constituencies on 29 July 2011. The Human Rights Protection Party retained its seats in Anoamaa East (new MP: Alo Fulifuli Taveuveu), Aleipata Itupa I Luga (Fagaaivalu Kenrick Samu) and Satupaitea (Lautafi Fio Selafi Purcell), and won the seat of Vaisigano No.1 from the Tautua Samoa Party, with the election of Tufuga Gafoleata Faitua.
 Tuilo'a Anitele'a Tuilo'a (HRPP MP for Gaga'ifomauga 1) died on 9 June 2014, leading to a by-election on 15 August. Faimalotoa Kika Stowers (HRPP) was elected to replace him, bringing the number of women in Parliament to three.

References

External links
 Parliament of Samoa

 2011